Vico Meien (born 15 March 1998) is a German footballer who plays as a defensive midfielder for VfR Aalen.

Career
Meien made his professional debut for TSV Havelse in the 3. Liga on 24 July 2021 against 1. FC Saarbrücken.

References

External links
 
 
 
 

1998 births
Living people
German footballers
Association football midfielders
FC Eintracht Norderstedt 03 players
TSV Havelse players
VfR Aalen players
3. Liga players
Regionalliga players